John B. Oden (September 10, 1902 – February 22, 1972) was an American Negro league third baseman between 1927 and 1932.

A native of Sylacauga, Alabama, Oden made his Negro leagues debut in 1927 for the Memphis Red Sox and Birmingham Black Barons. He went on to play two more seasons with Birmingham, and finished his career in 1932 with the Louisville Black Caps. Oden died in Birmingham, Alabama in 1972 at age 69.

References

External links
 and Seamheads

1902 births
1972 deaths
Birmingham Black Barons players
Louisville Black Caps players
Memphis Red Sox players
20th-century African-American sportspeople
Baseball infielders